The Graz School, also Meinong's School, of experimental psychology and object theory was headed by Alexius Meinong, who was professor and Chair of Philosophy at the University of Graz where he founded the Graz Psychological Institute (Grazer Psychologische Institut) in 1894. The Graz School's phenomenological psychology and philosophical semantics achieved important advances in philosophy and psychological science.

History
Meinong developed the Graz School with the assistance of his students Christian von Ehrenfels (founder of Gestalt psychology) and Alois Höfler. The growth of his theory, however, occurred later when he started teaching and conducted research at Graz where he received contributions from students who also later became his philosophical successors. Meinong and these proteges – particularly their work on phenomenological psychology and philosophical semantics – gained advances in all major areas of philosophy and psychological science. Among Meinong's pupils were Stephan Witasek, Vittorio Benussi, Rudolf Ameseder, Konrad Zindler, Wilhelm Maria Frankl, Eduard Martinak, Ernst Mally, Steno Tedeschi, and Franz Weber. Meinong's earlier students, von Ehrenfels (founder of Gestalt psychology), Höfler, Adalbert Meingast, and Anton Oelzelt-Newin, can be considered part of this school. The assistance of these students allowed Meinong to further refine his theories such as object theory.

The Graz School also played an important role in Gestalt theory as Meniong's model of cognition became an important research foundation for Gestalt perception. The Graz School was part of the wider movement of Austrian realism.

Theories 
The Graz School developed much of Meinongs theories that covered various topics such as philosophical psychology, metaphysics, semantics and philosophy of language, theory of evidence, possibility and probability, and value theory as well as the analysis of emotion, imagination and abstraction. The School is known for its object theory and theory of the mind. An important foundation of the Graz School is Meinong's position that psychology is part of philosophy where the former (particularly descriptive psychology) is considered the fundamental discipline while the latter represents "a whole group of sciences". It also embraced the Brentano's ideas such as the empiricist methodology for scientific philosophy, the intentionality thesis, and the goal of developing an intentionalist philosophy of fact and value.

Object theory 
The object theory of the Graz School first emerged in Meinong's work, On Assumptions, published in 1902.

Aesthetics 
It is recognized that Witasek and Benussi assisted Meinong in his philosophical investigations and had contributed to the development of the Graz School. The development of the concept of aesthetic value in the Graz School is attributed to Witasek. Meinong's himself did not focus on this area in his investigations despite his interest in the arts. The subject was discussed in a 400-page book called Grundzuge der allgemeinen Asthetik, which addressed – according to the Meinongian framework – the problems that an aesthetic theory is expected to deal with during its time. This included the evaluation of the Meinongian theory of aesthetic enjoyment and its link to the psychology of the sense experience of aesthetic objects.

See also
 The Berlin School of experimental psychology founded by Carl Stumpf
 The School of Brentano

References

Psychological schools
History of psychology